Marbled catshark may refer to:
Australian marbled catshark (Atelomycterus macleayi)
Coral catshark (Atelomycterus marmoratus)
Roughtail catshark (Galeus arae)
Speckled carpetshark (Hemiscyllium trispeculare)